The 1927 Chicago mayoral election was held on April 5. Democratic incumbent William Emmett Dever was defeated by Republican candidate William Hale Thompson, who had served as mayor from 1915 to 1923. Former health commissioner John Dill Robertson, who had been allied with the ex-mayor, broke with Thompson to run on his own and received more than five percent of the vote. It remains  the last Chicago mayoral election not won by a Democrat.

Dever had enforced Prohibition despite being personally opposed to it. This led to increased bootlegging and violence in the city and reduced citizen support. Thompson and Robertson seized the opportunity and entered the race. Thompson promised to end the enforcement of Prohibition and accused the United Kingdom of trying to retake control of the United States, while Robertson promised to quash the crime wave. Thompson bitterly attacked his campaign opponents and it was public knowledge that he was supported and funded by Al Capone. Dever's supporters pushed back against Thompson's rhetoric, asserting that Dever had the sensible policies and the "decency" appropriate for the city. Thompson's victory damaged Chicago's national reputation.

To receive the Democratic nomination, Dever won the party's primary election with 91% of the vote, facing only a single weak opponent. Thompson defeated Cook County Board of Review Chairman Edward R. Litsinger in the Republican primary by a 14.61% margin of victory.

Background
Democrat William Emmett Dever had been elected mayor of Chicago in 1923 and initially focused on reform. Observing the corruption of city government caused by bootleggers, he resolved to crack down on the illegal liquor trade and strengthen enforcement of Prohibition. He was himself opposed to Prohibition, but felt that disregard for one law could lead to disregard for others. His crackdown on Prohibition was initially effective and led to him being considered a potential dark horse candidate for President of the United States. Nevertheless, the limited supply of alcohol led to bootleggers competing with one another, increasing violence in the city, lowering Chicagoans' approval of Dever's performance. Aware of the effects of Prohibition enforcement on his mayoralty, Dever was reluctant to run for a second term in 1927, a feeling strengthened by poor health and lucrative job offers in the private sector. George E. Brennan, chief of the Democratic party, felt that Dever was the Democrats' strongest candidate against Thompson, and he and businessman Julius Rosenwald convinced Dever to run for reelection.

Republican William Hale Thompson, known as "Big Bill", had been mayor for two terms from 1915 to 1923 and took advantage of the situation to run for a third term, promising to end the enforcement of Prohibition. Having declined a bid for reelection in 1923, he had managed to stay in the public eye by constructing a yawl named the Big Bill with his head as the figurehead and spending $25,000 to take it on an expedition to Borneo to find a tree-climbing fish, all ostensibly as a publicity stunt for the Illinois Waterway. He was immensely popular with the city's African-American community, having served as alderman of the 2nd ward, home of Chicago's largest black population, from 1900 to 1902. He also had enemies from his previous tenure, including the Chicago Tribune and the Chicago Daily News, and had started to wear out his welcome with former allies such as party boss Frederick Lundin.

John Dill Robertson, also known as "J.D.", "Doctor Dill", and "Dill Pickle", who had previously been the city's health commissioner from 1915 to 1922, the President of the Chicago Board of Education after that, and an ally of Thompson, ran against Thompson in the Republican primary supported by Lundin. Serving at the time as President of the West Parks Board, he promised to enforce Prohibition while it was still on the books and to smash organized crime in thirty days if elected, comparing gunmen gangs to boils and the bootleg industry to an appendix. Lundin later had Robertson withdraw from the Republican primary in order to campaign for candidate Edward R. Litsinger, and Robertson agreed not to run as an independent in the general election if Litsinger won the primary. Early in the campaign Thompson debated with live rats representing Robertson and Lundin.

Primary elections
Primary elections took place on February 22, along with primary elections for City Clerk and City Treasurer and the first round of aldermanic elections.

The New York Times characterized the primaries as plagued by, "shootings, sluggings, theft of ballot boxes, police raids and the arrest of about two hundred gangesters and repeaters at the polls". Ahead of the election, Cook County Highway Police Chief Michael Hughes came into conflict with General Superintendent of the Chicago Police Department Morgan Collins regarding election security. Hughes had ordered county highway police to supervise polls on the city's West Side. However, Collins then ordered the city police to arrest any county policemen found to be "loitering" around polling places.

Democratic primary

Dever faced no genuine opposition in his party's primary. Attorney Martin Walsh of the 27th ward filed on February 2, claiming to have the backing of "the old municipal ownership leaders" and joining the race "to give Mayor Dever a little exercise." Barratt O'Hara, former Lieutenant Governor of Illinois, withdrew from the race on February 11, claiming that running against Dever was hopeless and that Democrats opposed to Dever would vote in the Republican primary for Thompson.

Although he overwhelmingly defeated his token opponent, winning all the wards and securing the citywide vote by more than 10 to 1, Dever's vote total in the Democratic primary was less than the margin of victory Thompson had secured in the Republican primary. Dever's camp argued that this was not a bad omen but rather that, due to the lack of a competitive race in the Democratic primary, many of Dever's supporters either did not participate in the primaries or voted instead for Thompson in the Republican primary to try and nominate the weaker prospective opponent. Dever anticipated that he would still be able to win reelection with more than 600,000 votes in the general election.

Republican primary

Edward R. Litsinger, who was chairman of the Cook County Board of Review and backed by reform-minded U.S. Senator Charles S. Deneen and Edward J. Brundage, (the latter of whom had split from his political ally Robert E. Crowe by supporting Litsinger), announced his platform on January 9. He promised to compel the City Council to adopt an ordinance that would end the Chicago Traction Wars and consolidate all transportation lines under public ownership, to construct subways, to form a police investigation into the rampant crime, to look at causes of recent tax increases and investigate potential ways to reverse them, and to clean up streets and alleys. He criticized Thompson as having been corrupt during his previous tenure as mayor.

Robertson initially planned to run in the primary before dropping out in favor of Litsinger per his agreement with Lundin, mounting an independent bid upon Litsinger's primary loss. Former policeman Eugene McCaffrey filed for candidacy on February 2 and attracted suspicion as many of the names on his petition sheets appeared to have been written in the same handwriting. He was allowed on the ballot and received more than 1,500 votes.

The Republican primary was marked by intense vitriol between the candidates. Thompson accused Robertson of messy eating, stating that "[With] eggs in his whiskers, soup on his vest, you'd think the doc got his education driving a garbage wagon." Robertson retaliated, accusing Thompson of corruption. Litsinger reiterated such accusations against Thompson and further accused Thompson of conspiring to get 50,000 Democratic votes. Both candidates asserted that they were guaranteed victory and accused the other of conspiring to steal the primary.

In an open letter, Thompson charged that Edward Brundage and Fred Lundin were suburbanites and were guilty of betraying their city roots. He also alleged that Litsinger, who had come from Back of the Yards, had abandoned his roots, writing "You moved to the Gold Coast. Are you thinking of joining the high brows of Lake Forest and becoming a resident of Lake County too?"

Thompson won by a surprisingly large margin; to many, his victory itself was a surprise. He carried 49 of the city's 50 wards. After Thompson's victory, both partisans of Robertson and Democratic leaders claimed that Democratic voters for Thompson had propelled him to the Republican nomination, with the Democrats claiming that they did so in order to give Dever a weaker opponent in the general election. Additionally, The New York Times reported that thousands of Republicans had refused to cast a vote for either candidate in the primary. With Thompson's primary victory Robertson launched his independent campaign, having filed a petition the day of the primary with 43,724 signatures to get his People's Ownership Smash Crime Rings party on the ballot.

Independent Republican primary
The "Independent Republican" ticket held a primary. The mayoral slot had no candidates, but write-in votes were cast. Thompson won this primary, but chose not to accept their nomination.

General election
The general election was held on April 5, along with general elections for City Clerk and City Treasurer and aldermanic runoffs.

Campaign

Thompson accused Dever of treason. Using the slogan "America First", he alleged that school superintendent William McAndrew was a British agent sent by King George as part of a grand conspiracy to manipulate the minds of American children and set the groundwork for the United Kingdom to repossess the United States; he accused the "left-handed Irishman" Dever of being part of the plot. Thompson based these claims on McAndrew being critical of such artworks as Archibald Willard's The Spirit of '76 and allowing the use in schools of textbooks which Thompson believed were unpatriotic. Thompson declared that his America First slate would elect so many of its candidates that "the king of England will find out for the first time he is damned unpopular", and implied that he might have Dever sent to jail. He described Dever as "very weak, no courage, no manhood, doesn't know how to fight". He promised to reform the police department by ending enforcement of prohibition. He also criticized the League of Nations and the World Court. Thompson also supported ending the metering of municipal water.

Democratic chief Brennan said that "All the hoodlums are for Thompson", which Thompson used to convince his supporters that the Democrats were elitist and looked down upon them. Campaigning for German votes, Thompson stated: 

Dever largely refused to engage in Thompson's style of rhetoric. He instead promised to engage in a debate of substantive issues, partaking only in a "decent, friendly discussion without malice or sensationalism". He responded to Thompson's accusations by declaring them "blarney" which he had no intention of dignifying, and noting that Thompson's comments on international affairs were irrelevant to the duties and powers of the mayoralty. He ran on the slogans "Dever for Decency" and "The best mayor Chicago ever had", the former also used by The Independent Republicans for Dever Committee. He attempted, particularly early in the race, to tout parts of his record such as his construction of Wacker Drive and 51 new schools, as well as a pure milk ordinance he had helped pass. He promised to continue his construction program, including building a long-anticipated State Street subway and widening LaSalle Street. He demurred that "no superman can be found to eliminate crime". Dever's campaign characterized Thompson as, "a political pyromaniac". Dever did once comment in an interview with the Chicago Daily News that, "Thompson's trouble is mental".

Supporters of both Thompson and Dever resorted to bigotry. Some Republicans used anti-Catholic rhetoric against Dever. Some Democrats attempted to take advantage of Thompson's positive relation with the city's African-American community and divide voters racially, claiming that Thompson's election would lead to "Negro supremacy". Palm cards were circulated with an image of Thompson kissing a black boy and with the reverse side reading "Thompson—Me Africa First". Some Democrats hired black people to canvass white neighborhoods for Thompson in an effort to scare white voters. They also attempted to lure black Thompson voters downtown, where they did not often go, with a fake rally outside of Thompson's campaign headquarters. Additionally, the song "Bye Bye Blackbird" was sung at some Dever rallies. Dever supporters also mocked Thompson and his supporters by having a Black man dress up as Paul Revere ride on horseback through the Chicago Loop shouting "The British are coming." Supporters of each candidate accused the other's supporters of plotting to use underhanded tactics to steal the election. In the closing day of the campaign, Dever and Thompson accused each other of attempting to incite a race riot among the city's Black populace.

Robertson continued his platform of quashing crime, promising to "find another Theodore Roosevelt" as police chief and smash organized crime within thirty days. At a rally on March 28, 1927, Robertson announced that, if elected, he would appoint former United States attorney Edwin A. Olson as police chief.

Ahead of election day, analysts perceived Dever as gaining new momentum in the closing days of the campaign.

Endorsements
Thompson was backed by two Hearst-owned newspapers, as well as the African-American Daily Defender and L'Italia, the city's second-best selling Italian newspaper. Four of the city's daily newspapers backed Dever, as did the city's largest Polish, Jewish, and Italian newspapers.

The Chicago Federation of Labor endorsed Thompson. Margaret Haley, president of the Chicago Federation of Teachers, personally endorsed him as well. The Cook County Wage-Earners' League ran an advertisement for Thompson in the Chicago Tribune, in which it claimed that 95 percent of the trade unions in Chicago endorsed him. However, in actuality, labor support was divided between the two major party candidates. While the Cook County Wage Earners, headed by Chicago Federation of Labor vice-president Oscar F. Nelson, backed Thompson, a notable group of labor officials also backed Dever. Among those backing Dever were Chicago Federation of Labor president John Fitzpatrick and Illinois State Federation of Labor secretary Victory A. Olander. Dever also received the endorsement of the union representing the city's transit employees (workers on its streetcar and elevated lines).

After Thompson beat Deneen's favored candidate in the primary Deneen backed Thompson in the general election.  Martin Walsh, who had run against Dever in the Democratic primary, served as a stump speaker for Thompson. Thompson was also endorsed by Illinois Attorney General Oscar E. Carlstrom, Illinois Secretary of State Louis Lincoln Emmerson, Illinois Lieutenant Governor Fred E. Sterling, Cook County Sheriff Charles E. Graydon, Cook County Coroner Oscar Wolff and Chicago Postmaster (and 1923 Republican mayoral nominee) Arthur C. Lueder. Thompson also received a last-minute endorsement from Illinois Governor Len Small.

Thompson received the endorsement of Al Capone after promising lax enforcement of Prohibition. It was public knowledge that Capone was supporting Thompson's campaign effort, collecting campaign contributions from those who sold his beer. Capone donated between $100,000 and $500,000 to Thompson's campaign. Other crime figures backing Thompson included Jack Zuta, who gave $50,000 to his campaign, Timothy D. Murphy, and Vincent Drucci.

Dever was endorsed by prominent reformers campaigning for "Dever and Decency" on his behalf, including Charles Edward Merriam, Harriet Vittum, Harold L. Ickes, and Jane Addams. The Ministerial Association of Chicago also endorsed Dever, calling him "the best mayor Chicago ever had ... [and] as loyal as a Catholic as he is [a] citizen". He was backed by businessmen Sewell Avery, Julius Rosenwald, and W. A. Wieboldt, as well as university presidents Max Mason and Walter Dill Scott and attorney Orville James Taylor. He was also backed by socialites Louise deKoven Bowen and Edward Ryerson Jr, as well as builder Potter Palmer and Donald Richberg. School superintendent William McAndrew distributed a letter to school principals urging for people to vote Dever.

In addition to Lundin, Robertson was supported by the incumbent 43rd ward alderman Arthur F. Albert, whose opponent Titus Haffa endorsed Thompson. Henry F. Batterman, Lundin's 41st ward committeeman, supported Robertson before crossing over to Thompson. Despite Thompson's popularity with African American voters, there were Edward Herbert Wright-aligned Black Republicans who publicly backed Robertson.

Polling

Chicago Tribune straw polls
The Chicago Tribune conducted straw polls during a portion of the campaign. The first of these polls was published on March 20, 1927. These were not modern scientific polls, and many focused on specific sub-portions of the city's populace, rather than true representative samples.

The Chicago Tribune straw polls indicated that Thompson had very strong support among African Americans. The cummulative result of all 132,107 straw votes cast over the polls published between March 20 and April 4, 1927, was 51.20% Thompson, 44.22% Dever, and 4.56% Robertson. Despite Thompson regularly leading these polls, on April 4, 1927, the Chicago Tribune wrote that a "Dever plurality" was indicated by an increasing trend towards the mayor in the later days of straw polling.

Chicago Business Men's Republican Committee straw polls
Newspaper advertisements for Robertson's campaign run by the Chicago Business Men's Republican Committee included straw polls which each surveyed several locations in the city. The committee, which actively supported Robertson's candidacy, had tabulated the straw polls itself.

Election day security
Due to fears of race riots on election day, ahead of the election, there was talk of the military potentially providing security in the city on election day. Ultimately, the Chicago Police Department sent 5,000 men (including standard policemen, plain clothes officers, and special machine gun squads) to guard the polls. Police superintendent Morgan A. Collins warned the city's criminal elements, "Any gangsters that are out Tuesday had batter wear bullet-proof vests," warning that the police planned to, "shoot first, talk afterward." The Sherman House Hotel, home to both Dever and Thompson's campaign headquarters, was given police security scrutiny on election day. Despite Cook County Sheriff Charles E. Graydon requesting that Illinois National Guardsmen be kept at the ready, they were not called to the city. Instead, Adjutant General of Illinois Carlos E. Black promised that gaurdsmen would be able to be deployed on a two-hour notice. Thompson himself had urged for the National Guard to be sent to secure the polls in Chicago. In all, more than 5,000 police officers in 100 squads guarded the city during the election.

The city avoided rioting on election day. Universal Service described the election as the city's "quietest election in recent years" in terms of electoral violence. In an incident of election crime, gangsters managed to steal the ballot boxes from the 29th precinct of the 45th ward at gunpoint. Shot fatally during election day law enforcement activity was mobster Vincent Drucci.

The election was marked by an unusually low level of crime: only one ballot box theft and a negligible amount of violence. Some claimed that this was due to Capone using his men to guard polling stations and ensure votes for Thompson, but contemporary accounts make no mention of gang activity and police were dispatched to guard polling stations, aided by City Hall employees. Police attributed the quiet at least in part to the death of Drucci, who had allegedly raided the downtown offices of the Dever-supporting 42nd Ward alderman Dorsey Crowe the day before the election and was killed by police upon his arrest later that night. Among some of the incidents of crime that were reported was the kidnapping of two election judges. Two buildings were bombed, including a soft drink establishment owned by State Representative Lawrence C. O'Brien.

Result
The election set the then-record for the most votes cast in a Chicago mayoral election, with just under a million votes being cast. 

Thompson won the election with more than 51 percent of votes cast, carrying 28 of the city's 50 wards. Dever's campaign ultimately failed to achieve momentum; Thompson had dominated the discourse early on and left Dever's supporters struggling to react to Thompson's campaign and ultimately failing to fully promote Dever's own message.

Dever saw a significant decline in support from the Democratic party's stronghold, the city's white, working-class, inner-city wards. His support improved in traditionally Republican White Anglo-Saxon Protestant precincts along Chicago's lakeshore. Thompson carried the Black vote by more than 10 to 1, taking the three wards of Chicago's "Black Belt" by more than 59,000 votes. The Associated Press credited the Black vote with supplying Thompson with his victory. According to one study, Thompson received 42.20 percent of the Polish-American vote, Dever 54.07 percent and Robertson 3.73 percent; other sources suggest Thompson may have carried as much as 46 percent of the Polish-American vote. By some accounts, Thompson carried 41 percent of the Czech-American vote and 43 percent of the Lithuanian-American vote, groups that typically firmly supported Democrats. He also won more than 60 percent of the German-American and Swedish-American votes, as well as the Italian-American and Jewish votes. Edward Mazur divided his study of the Jewish vote into two groups, the European/German Jews and the Eastern European Jews. He found that Eastern European Jewish precincts were carried by Thompson 55 to 41 percent, while the German Jewish precincts were carried by Dever 62 to 35 percent.

Aftermath 
The results of the election damaged Chicago's reputation nationally. Will Rogers remarked that "They was trying to beat Bill [Thompson] with the Better Element vote. The trouble with Chicago is that there ain't much Better Element." The St. Louis Star declared that "Chicago is still a good deal of a Wild West town, where a soapbox showman extracting white rabbits from a gentleman's plug hat still gets a better hearing than a man in a sober suit talking business." The campaign was such that philosopher Will Durant wondered whether democracy was dead.

The election of Thompson attracted not just national, but also strong international attention. The British The Daily News newspaper declared that the election affirmed the validity of, "the description of Chicago as the most lawless city in the world," and wrote, 

Many experts concluded that Thompson had won because of his skilled campaigning, providing entertainment while Dever called for virtue. Elmer Davis of Harper's Magazine mused that the mystery was not that Dever lost but that he had received 430,000 votes. George Schottenhamel, writing in 1952 for the Journal of the Illinois State Historical Society, argued that Dever "would have been easy opposition for any candidate" running "on a campaign of 'Dever and Decency' despite four years of rampant crime in Chicago".

Communist leader Arne Swabeck called the election "one of the greatest mud-slinging contests ever managed by the 'celebrated' American political parties," and opined that it demonstrated how labor voters should cease "awarding friends and punishing enemies" of capitalist politicians in the major political parties.

Nobody had expected Robertson to win. The Chicago Tribune noted that he had finished a "poor third" and polled "only" 51,209 votes; The Daily Independent of Murphysboro considered him to have finished at a "hopeless third". Koop's performance of two votes was picked up by the Associated Press and used by an editorial of the Ottawa Citizen as evidence that the threat of socialism was overblown.

The New York Times regarded Thompson's victory to be "a blow" to the power of Frank Orren Lowden, as it was anticipated to give Thompson and Deneen control over Cook County's delegates to the 1928 Republican National Convention.

Thompson, had previously, in 1920, had unfulfilled ambitions to run on the Republican Party presidential ticket (either as the Republican Party's presidential or vice presidential nominee). In the immediate aftermath of his victory, The New York Times observed that, "these ambitions have been fired anew by his success in the Mayoralty election."

In his inaugural address, Thompson reiterated his pledge to oust Superintendent McAndrew. In August 1927, the Chicago Board of Education, now under Thompson's influence after he appointed a number new members, voted to charge McAndrew with insubordination and unpatriotic “conduct incompatible and inconsistent with, and in direct violation" of his duties, suspending him pending an administrative hearing held by the board. The administrative hearing would last months, and the Chicago Board of Education would find McAndrew guilty. The Cook County Superior Court would later void this decision.

Thompson would lose to Democrat Anton Cermak in the 1931 Chicago mayoral election as his public approval fell victim to continuing crime and the Great Depression. Historians generally consider Thompson one of the most unethical mayors in American history, in large part due to his alliance with Capone. Dever would serve as the vice president of a bank and died of pancreatic cancer in 1929. Robertson was re-elected as the West Park President two days after the election, and died in 1931 of heart disease. To date, this is the last mayoral election in Chicago won by a Republican candidate.

Notes

References

Works cited
 
 
 
 
 
 
 
 
 

1927
Chicago
1927 Illinois elections
1920s in Chicago
William Hale Thompson